Pseudoflavitalea soli is a Gram-negative, rod-shaped and mesophilic bacterium which was initially isolated from soil from the Baengnyeong Island in Korea. The species was initially classified as Flavitalea soli when it was first described in 2016, was reclassified later that year into the novel genus Pseudoflavitalea.

References

External links
Type strain of Flavitalea soli at BacDive -  the Bacterial Diversity Metadatabase

Chitinophagia
Bacteria described in 2016